Grand Canyon National Park Act of 1919 is a United States statute establishing Grand Canyon National Park in the state of Arizona. The Act of Congress describes geographic metes and bounds relative to the tract of land designating the Grand Canyon Park. The public law authorizes provisions for agricultural purposes, mineral prospecting rights, irrigation projects, and railroad easements. The Act provides restrictions for building on private land, game preserve exclusion, and rescinding the Grand Canyon National Monument as created by Presidential Proclamation 794 in 1908.

The S. 390 legislation was passed by the 65th United States Congressional session and enacted into law by the 28th President of the United States Woodrow Wilson on February 26, 1919.

U.S. Congressional Public Land Provisions
Chronological legislation relative to U.S. Congressional revisions as pertaining to the Grand Canyon National Park.

See also

References

External links
 
 
 
 
 
 
 
 
 

1919 in American law
65th United States Congress